Thankful Villages (also known as Blessed Villages) are settlements in England and Wales from which all their members of the armed forces survived World War I. The term Thankful Village was popularised by the writer Arthur Mee in the 1930s; in Enchanted Land (1936), the introductory volume to The King's England series of guides, he wrote that a Thankful Village was one which had lost no men in the war because all those who left to serve came home again. His initial list identified 32 villages. There are tens of thousands of villages and towns in the United Kingdom.

In an October 2013 update, researchers identified 53 civil parishes in England and Wales from which all serving personnel returned.  There are no Thankful Villages identified in Scotland or Ireland yet (all of Ireland was then part of the United Kingdom).

Fourteen of the English and Welsh villages are considered "doubly thankful", in that they also lost no service personnel during World War II. These are marked in italics in the list below (note: while the list includes 17 of these, not all have been verified).

List of Thankful Villages
The researchers acknowledged a number of other villages which have been put forward as Thankful Villages but where they found there to be some uncertainty, generally over the place of residence of a serviceman.

England

Buckinghamshire
Stoke Hammond
Cambridgeshire
Toft
Cornwall
Herodsfoot
Cumberland
Ousby
Derbyshire
Bradbourne
Dorset
Langton Herring
Durham
Hunstanworth
Essex
Strethall
Gloucestershire
Coln Rogers
Little Sodbury
Upper Slaughter
Herefordshire
Knill
Middleton-on-the-Hill
Hertfordshire
Puttenham
Kent
Knowlton
Lancashire
Arkholme
Nether Kellet
Leicestershire
Saxby
East Norton
Stretton en le Field
Lincolnshire
Bigby
Flixborough
High Toynton
Minting
Allington

Northamptonshire
East Carlton
Woodend
Northumberland
Meldon
Nottinghamshire
Cromwell
Maplebeck
Wigsley
Wysall
Rutland
Teigh
Shropshire
Harley
Somerset
Aisholt
Chantry
Chelwood
Holywell Lake
Rodney Stoke
Shapwick
Stocklinch
Tellisford
Woolley
Staffordshire
Butterton
Suffolk
Culpho
Wordwell
South Elmham St Michael
Sussex
East Wittering
Yorkshire
Catwick
Cundall
Helperthorpe
Norton-le-Clay
Scruton

Wales
Ceredigion
Llanfihangel y Creuddyn
Glamorgan
Colwinston/Tregolwyn
Pembrokeshire
Herbrandston

Tavernspite, in Pembrokeshire, has been mooted as a fourth doubly thankful village in Wales.

France

In France, where the human cost of war was higher than in Britain, there were only twelve villages in all of France with no men lost from World War I.  One of these, Thierville, also suffered no losses in the Franco-Prussian War and World War II, France's other bloody wars of the modern era.

In popular culture 

On 3 June 2016 singer-songwriter Darren Hayman released the first of three albums inspired by and written in-situ at the Thankful Villages. 54 villages were covered, including Welbury, North Yorkshire, not in the 53 listed above.

References 

United Kingdom in World War I